Susawat or Susaot is the name of a historical Meena clan during medieval India. They ruled over the historical region of India called Amber.

History
Amer was ruled by the Susawat clan of Meenas. He was defeated by Kakil Deo, the son of Dulherai and after Khoh, Amer was made the capital of Dhundhar.

References 

Meena people